Dorcadion kollari is a species of beetle in the family Cerambycidae. It was described by Kraatz in 1873. It is known from Turkey.

Varietas
 Dorcadion kollari var. anticepunctatum Breuning, 1946
 Dorcadion kollari var. quadripunctum Breuning, 1946
 Dorcadion kollari var. unipunctum Breuning, 1946

References

kollari
Beetles described in 1873